Hull City Association Football Club is a professional football club based in Hull, East Riding of Yorkshire, England, that compete in the . They have played home games at the MKM Stadium since moving from Boothferry Park in 2002. The club's traditional home colours are black and amber, often featuring in a striped shirt design, hence their nickname, The Tigers. They hold Humber derby rivalries with Scunthorpe United and Grimsby Town.

The club was founded in 1904 and admitted into the Football League two years later. They remained in the Second Division until relegation in 1930. Hull won the Third Division North title in 1932–33, but were relegated three years later. They won the Third Division North under the stewardship of Raich Carter in 1948–49, and this time remained in the second tier for seven seasons. Having been promoted again in 1958–59, they were relegated the following season and remained in the Third Division until they were promoted as champions under Cliff Britton in 1965–66. Twelve seasons in the second tier culminated in two relegations in four years by 1981. They were promoted from the Fourth Division at the end of the 1982–83 campaign and were beaten finalists in the inaugural Associate Members' Cup in 1984.

Hull were relegated in 1991 and again in 1996, but secured back-to-back promotions in 2003–04 and 2004–05. The club went on to win the 2008 play-off final against Bristol City to win a place in the Premier League for the first time. They were relegated after two seasons, but were promoted again from the Championship in 2012–13. Hull played in their first FA Cup final in 2014, who despite scoring twice early on, lost 3–2 to Arsenal after extra-time. Relegated from the Premier League the following year, they returned for a third time with victory in the 2016 play-off final. They were relegated again from the top flight just a year later, before dropping into the third tier in 2020. Hull secured immediate promotion as champions of League One at the end of the 2020–21 campaign.

History

Early years (1904–1930) 
Hull City Association Football Club was founded in June 1904; previous attempts to found a football club had proved difficult because of the dominance in the city of rugby league teams such as Hull F.C. and Hull Kingston Rovers. The club was unable to apply for membership of the Football League for the 1904–05 season and instead played only in friendlies, the first of which was a 2–2 draw with Notts County on 1 September 1904 with 6,000 in attendance. These early matches were played at the Boulevard, the home of Hull F.C. The club's first competitive football match was in the FA Cup preliminary round, drawing 3–3 with Stockton on 17 September, but they were eliminated after losing the replay 4–1 on 22 September. After disputes with landlords at the Boulevard, Hull City moved to Anlaby Road Cricket Ground. After having played 44 friendly fixtures the previous season, Hull City were finally admitted into the Football League Second Division for the 1905–06 season. Other teams competing in the league that season included the likes of Manchester United and Chelsea, as well as Yorkshire rivals Barnsley, Bradford City and Leeds City. Hull defeated Barnsley 4–1 at home in their first game and finished the season in fifth place.

Hull City and Grimsby Town were the only two professional teams which had official permission to play league football on Christmas Day because of the demands of the fish trade, but that tradition has now disappeared following the dramatic reduction of their trawler fleets in recent years.
The following season a new ground was built for Hull City across the road from the cricket ground. Still under the managership of Ambrose Langley, Hull continued to finish consistently in the top half of the table. They came close to promotion in the 1909–10 season, recording what would be their highest finish until they matched it in 2008. Hull finished third, level on points with second placed Oldham Athletic, missing promotion on goal average by 0.29 of a goal. Hull regularly finished in the top half of the table before the First World War, but after the war the team finished in the bottom half in seven seasons out of eleven, culminating in relegation to the Third Division North in 1930.

Cup success and financial crisis (1930–1985)  

Hull's greatest achievement in cup competitions until 2014 was in 1930, when they reached the FA Cup semi-finals. The cup run saw Hull knock out the eventual champions of the Second and Third Divisions; Blackpool and Plymouth Argyle respectively. They then knocked out Manchester City, to meet Newcastle United in the quarter-finals. The first game at St James' Park finished as a 1–1 draw, but in the replay Hull beat Newcastle 1–0. The semi-final match against Arsenal took place at Elland Road in Leeds, the game ended 2–2, and was taken to a replay in Birmingham. Arsenal knocked Hull out at Villa Park, the game ending 1–0.

After the Second World War, the club moved to another new ground, Boothferry Park. In the 1948–49 season, managed by former England international Raich Carter, Hull won the Third Division North championship. "Yo-yoing" between the second and third tiers of English football, Hull City had promotion seasons from the Third to the Second Division again in 1959 and 1966, winning the Third Division in the latter season. Hull also became the first team in the world to go out of a cup competition on penalties, beaten by Manchester United in the semi-final of the Watney Cup on 1 August 1970. By the early 1980s, Hull City were in the Fourth Division, and financial collapse led to receivership.

Don Robinson took over as chairman and appointed Colin Appleton as the new manager. Both had previously held the equivalent roles with non-league Scarborough. Promotion to Division Three followed in 1983, with a young team featuring the likes of future England international Brian Marwood, future England manager Steve McClaren, centre-forward Billy Whitehurst, and the prolific goal-scorer Les Mutrie. When Hull City missed out on promotion by one goal the following season, Appleton left to manage Swansea City.

Late 20th-century decline (1985–2000) 
Hull reached the Second Division in 1985 under player-manager Brian Horton. They remained there for the next six years before finally going down in 1991, by which time the club's manager was Terry Dolan. Hull finished 14th in the Third Division in the 1991–92 season, meaning that they would be competing in the new Second Division the following season. In their first season in the rebranded division, Hull narrowly avoided another relegation, but the board kept faith in Dolan and over the next two seasons they achieved mid-table finishes. Financial difficulties hampered City's progress, as key players such as Alan Fettis and Dean Windass
had to be sold to fend off winding-up orders. In the 1995–96 season Hull were relegated to the Third Division.

In 1997 the club was purchased by former tennis player David Lloyd, who sacked Dolan as manager and replaced him with Mark Hateley after Hull could only finish in 17th place in the table. Hull's league form was steadily deteriorating to the point that relegation to the Football Conference was looking a real possibility. Lloyd sold the club in November 1998 to a South Yorkshire-based consortium, but retained ownership of Boothferry Park. Hateley departed in November 1998, with the club at the foot of the table. He was replaced by 34-year-old veteran player Warren Joyce, who steered the club to safety with games to spare. Hull City fans refer to this season as "The Great Escape". Despite this feat, Joyce was replaced in April 2000 by the more experienced Brian Little.

Despite briefly being locked out of Boothferry Park by bailiffs and facing the possibility of liquidation, Hull qualified for the Third Division play-offs in the 2000–01 season, losing in the semi-finals to Leyton Orient. A boardroom takeover by former Leeds United commercial director Adam Pearson had eased the club's precarious financial situation and all fears of closure were banished.

Rise to the top flight (2000–2008) 
The new chairman ploughed funds into the club, allowing Little to rebuild the team. Hull occupied the Third Division promotion and play-off places for much of the 2001–02 season, but Little departed two months before the end of the season and Hull slipped to 11th place under his successor Jan Mølby.

Hull began the 2002–03 season with a number of defeats, which saw relegation look more likely than promotion, and Mølby was sacked in October as Hull languished fifth from bottom in the league. Peter Taylor was named as Hull's new manager and in December 2002, just two months after his appointment, Hull relocated to the new 25,400-seater KC Stadium after 56 years at Boothferry Park. At the end of the season Hull finished 13th.

Hull were Third Division runners-up in 2003–04 and League One runners-up in 2004–05; these back-to-back promotions took them into the Championship, the second tier of English football. The 2005–06 season, the club's first back in the second tier, saw Hull finish in 18th place, 10 points clear of relegation and their highest league finish for 16 years.

However, Taylor left the club to take up the manager's job at Crystal Palace and Colchester United's Phil Parkinson was confirmed as his replacement, but was sacked on 4 December 2006 with Hull in the relegation zone, despite having spent over £2 million on players during the summer. Phil Brown took over as caretaker manager, and took over permanently in January 2007, having taken Hull out of the relegation zone. Brown brought veteran striker Dean Windass back to his hometown club on loan from Bradford City, and his eight goals helped secure Hull's Championship status as they finished in 21st place.

Adam Pearson sold the club to a consortium led by Paul Duffen in June 2007, stating that he "had taken the club as far as I could", and would have to relinquish control in order to attract "really significant finance into the club". Under Paul Duffen and manager Phil Brown, Hull City improved greatly on their relegation battle of 2006–07 and qualified for the play-offs after finishing the season in third place. They beat Watford 6–1 on aggregate in the semi-finals and played Bristol City in the final on 24 May 2008, which Hull won 1–0 at Wembley Stadium, with Hull native Dean Windass scoring the winning goal. Their ascent from the bottom division of the Football League to the top division of English football in just five seasons is the third-fastest ever.

Promotion, yo-yo years and sale (2008–2016) 
Despite being one of the favourites for relegation in the 2008–09 season, Hull began life in the Premier League by beating Fulham 2–1 on the opening day in their first ever top flight fixture. With only one defeat in their opening nine games, including away wins at Arsenal and Tottenham Hotspur, Hull City found themselves (temporarily) joint-top of the Premier League table on points (third on goal difference), following a 3–0 victory over West Bromwich Albion – ten years previously, they had been bottom of the fourth tier of English football. Hull's form never replicated the highs of the early autumn, with the team winning only two more games over the remainder of the season, but secured their top-flight status on the last day of the season due to other results.

On 29 October 2009, chairman Paul Duffen resigned his position with the club, and was replaced by former chairman Adam Pearson on 2 November 2009. On 15 March 2010, manager Phil Brown was put on gardening leave after a run of four defeats left Hull in the relegation zone. Brown's replacement was former Crystal Palace and Charlton boss Iain Dowie, and the appointment was met with some disbelief by supporters who were hoping for a "bigger name" replacement. Hull City's relegation from the Premier League was confirmed on 3 May 2010, after a 2–2 draw at Wigan Athletic. Both Brown and Dowie had their contracts terminated, and Leicester City's Nigel Pearson was confirmed as the new manager.

A reported block on player transfers into the club, set in place by the Hull City board on 28 July 2010 until transfers out would substantially reduce the £39 million-per-year wage bill, at first cast doubt on the new manager's efforts to build a squad capable of a quick return to the Premier League; nevertheless, Pearson brought several transfers and loan signings into the club in his bid to strengthen the squad for the season's campaign. The team set a new club record on 12 March 2011 with 14 away matches unbeaten, breaking a previous record held for over 50 years. This 17-match streak was finally broken by Bristol City on the last day of the 2010–11 season, Hull losing the match 3–0.

On 15 November 2011, Nigel Pearson left the club to return to Leicester. Nick Barmby was appointed as his successor, but was sacked in May 2012 after publicly criticising the club's owners in an interview given to a local newspaper. In the same month, the club's consultancy agreement with Adam Pearson was terminated. On 8 June 2012, Steve Bruce was appointed manager of the club on a three-year deal, and he guided Hull back to the Premier League by drawing with League champions Cardiff City on the final day of the season.

On 13 April 2014, the club reached its first FA Cup Final after defeating Sheffield United 5–3 in the semi-final at Wembley Stadium. Their place in the 2014–15 UEFA Europa League, regardless of whether they won the 2013–14 FA Cup, was confirmed on 3 May as Everton's failure to win meant that Hull's FA Cup Final opponents Arsenal would compete in the 2014–15 UEFA Champions League, leaving Hull City to enter in the Europa League third qualifying round, in their first ever European campaign. The FA Cup final on 17 May saw Hull go 2–0 up within the first ten minutes, before losing 3–2 after extra time.

On 31 July 2014, Hull made their debut in European competition, in the UEFA Europa League third qualifying round, with a 0–0 draw against Slovakian side FK AS Trenčín before winning the second leg 2–1 a week later. An error from keeper Allan McGregor gave them a 1–0 loss away to Belgian outfit Lokeren in the first leg of their play-off tie on 21 August 2014 with the second leg at home ending in a 2–1 victory, but away goals marked the end of Hull's first foray into European football.

In March 2015, Steve Bruce signed a further three-year deal with the club. Hull were relegated from the Premier League after the 2014–15 season, finishing eighteenth with 35 points after a 0–0 draw against Manchester United, along with Newcastle United securing their Premier League Status after beating West Ham United 2–0. In October 2015 Hull beat Leicester City in a penalty-shootout to take them through to their first ever quarter-final appearance in the Football League Cup. The club reached the Championship play-offs and on 28 May 2016 beat Sheffield Wednesday 1–0 to return to the Premier League.

Decline and fall to League One (2016–2021) 
On 22 July 2016, Bruce resigned from his position as manager due to an alleged rift with the club's owners and Mike Phelan was appointed caretaker manager. In October 2016, Phelan became Hull's permanent head coach but he was sacked just 3 months later on 3 January 2017 after a poor run of results. Marco Silva was appointed as his replacement two days later but he could not prevent relegation at the end of the season.

Following relegation Silva resigned, and on 9 June 2017, the club announced the appointment of Leonid Slutsky as the new head coach. However, after a poor run of results Slutsky left by mutual consent in December 2017. He was replaced by former Southampton boss Nigel Adkins who led the team to avoid relegation and finish 18th at the end of the season.  The following season, despite being in the relegation zone after 19 games, an upturn in form saw the Tigers finish in 13th place. However, Adkins resigned at the end of the season after rejecting a new contract.

On 21 June 2019, Grant McCann was appointed as head coach on a one-year rolling contract. In a season delayed due to the COVID-19 pandemic in the United Kingdom, Hull started well but lost 16 of their last 20 games, a run that included an 8–0 hammering at Wigan. On 22 July 2020, Hull were relegated to League One. On 24 April 2021, Hull were promoted back to the Championship at the first time of asking after a 2–1 victory away at Lincoln City. The following week, a 3–1 win at home to Wigan Athletic saw the Tigers crowned EFL League One Champions.

Return to The Championship and takeover by Acun Ilıcalı (2021–present) 

On 19 January 2022, following months of negotiations and speculation, Turkish media mogul Acun Ilıcalı and his company Acun Medya, completed a takeover of the club, ending the club's controversial 11 year ownership under the Allam family. The club sat 19th in The Championship at the time that the takeover was announced.
On 25 January 2022, manager Grant McCann and his assistant Cliff Byrne left the club.
On 27 January 2022, Shota Arveladze was announced as the new head coach. Hull achieved Championship survival in the 2021–22 season with a 19th-place finish. On 30 September 2022, Arveladze was sacked after a run of four league defeats and Andy Dawson was appointed as interim head coach. On 3 November 2022, the club announced Liam Rosenior as the new head coach on a two-and-a-half-year deal.

Club identity

Colours and crest 

For most of the club's history, Hull have worn black and amber shirts with black shorts. These black and amber colours are where Hull's nickname, The Tigers, originated from. However, in the club's first match against Notts County in 1904, white shirts were worn, with black shorts and black socks. During their first season in the League, Hull wore black and amber striped shirts and black shorts, which they continued to wear until the Second World War with the exception of the 1935–36 season, in which they wore sky blue shirts. Following the end of the Second World War, Hull spent another season wearing sky blue, but changed to plain amber shirts, which they wore until the early 1960s, when they swapped back to stripes.

During the mid-1970s, and early 1980s, the strip was constantly changing between the two versions of plain shirts and stripes. During the late 1980s, red was added to the kits but its duration went no further than this.
The early 1990s featured two "tiger skin" designs, which have since featured in several articles listing the "worst ever" football kits. The 1998–99 season introduced a kit with cross-fading amber and white stripes, another experiment that proved unpopular. After the start of the 21st century, the club wore plain amber shirts until 2004, when the club celebrated its centenary by wearing a kit similar to the design of the one worn 100 years ago.

In 1935, Hull City's first shirt badge mirrored the familiar three crowns civic emblem of Kingston-upon-Hull, which was displayed on the sky blue shirts worn in the 1935–36 season. Following that season, the team went without wearing a badge until 1947, when the club crest depicted a tiger's head in an orange-shaded badge. This was worn up until 1957, when it was changed to just the tiger's head. This was worn for three years, when the shirt again featured no emblem. Then, in 1971, the club returned to showing the tiger's head on the shirt, which was used for four years. In 1975, the tiger's head was granted as a heraldic badge by the College of Arms to the English Football League for use by Hull City (blazoned as "A Bengal tiger's head erased proper"). Subsequently, the club's initials of HCAFC were shown for four years on the shirt. After this, a logo with the tiger's head with the club's name underneath was used from 1979 until 1998. The next logo, which remains the club's current logo, features the tiger's head in an amber shield with the club's name, along with the club's nickname, The Tigers.

Hull changed their crest in June 2014, becoming one of few English league teams without the club name on their crest.

From the close of the 2017–18 season a supporter-led process of redesigning the club crest took place with a new crest, to be used from the start of the 2019–20 season, being revealed in February 2019. This would be similar to the previous design but with the club name at the top and a different shape.

Kit manufacturers and sponsors

Name change

2013: Initial application 
In August 2013, owner Assem Allam announced that the club had re-registered as "Hull City Tigers Ltd," and that the team would be marketed as "Hull City Tigers," removing the "Association Football Club" that had been part of the name since the club's formation in 1904. Vice-chairman Ehab Allam said "AFC" would remain on the club badge for the 2013–14 season, but removed the "AFC" after.

In response, a Premier League spokesman said, "We have not been informed of a change in the name of the actual club. They will still be known as Hull City as far as the Premier League is concerned when results or fixtures are published."

According to its chairman, by 2014, the club would be further renamed "Hull Tigers," because, as he claimed, "in marketing, the shorter the name the more powerful [it is]," while "Association Football Club" made the name too long. Allam stated he dislikes the word "City", as it is too "common" and a "lousy identity", since it is associated also with other clubs, such as Leicester City, Bristol City and Manchester City. He told David Conn of The Guardian that "in a few years many clubs will follow and change their names to something more interesting and I will have proved I am a leader," adding that if he were the owner of Manchester City, he would change their name to "Manchester Hunter."

Allam justified the intended name change as part of his plans to create "additional sources of revenue" for the club, after Hull City Council refused to sell him the stadium freehold so he could develop, as he had stated, "a sports park" on the site. The council has refused to sell in order, as they stated, "to preserve the annual Hull Fair held on the adjacent car park." After the collapse of the negotiations, Allam stated: "I had in mind £30 million to spend on the infrastructure of the club, to increase the stadium by 10,000 and to have commercial activities around the stadium — cafeterias, shops, supermarkets — to have all this to create income for the club so that in the future it can be self-financing and not relying on me." He asked rhetorically, "What if I dropped dead tomorrow?"

Supporters' groups expressed opposition to the name change. Bernard Noble, chairman of Hull City's official supporters club said he was disappointed, although he agreed that Allam had saved the club from liquidation and that it was "his club". Blogger Rick Skelton called the name change "a pointless exercise" and said, "Mr Allam's assertion that the name 'Hull City' is irrelevant and too common, is as disgusting a use of the English language as his new name for the club." Before the first home match of the season on 24 August 2013, a group of supporters marched in protest against the name change, and unfurled a banner that read, "Hull City AFC: a club not a brand". Allam dismissed complaints by the fans, stating "nobody questions my decisions in my business."

In a comment published on 1 December 2013 in The Independent in response to supporters' chants and banners of "City Till We Die", Allam said, "They can die as soon as they want, as long as they leave the club for the majority who just want to watch good football." The supporters responded with chants of "We're Hull City, we'll die when we want" during that day's home match against Liverpool. Manager Steve Bruce credited the controversy for creating " a fantastic atmosphere" but added, "I have got to have a conversation with him because I don't think he quite understands what it means in terms of history and tradition." However, Bruce also said that, because of the money Allam had invested in the club, "If he thinks Hull Tigers is his way forward then we have to respect it."

On 11 December 2013, a spokesman for Hull City announced that the club had formally applied to the Football Association to have its name changed to "Hull Tigers" from the 2014–15 season onwards. The FA Council, which has "absolute discretion" in deciding whether to approve the plan or not, stated the next day that it would follow a "consultation process" with stakeholders, "including the club's supporter groups."

2014: Resistance and rejection 
Some brand and marketing experts have come out in support of the name change. Nigel Currie, director of sports marketing agency Brand Rapport, stated that "the whole process has been conducted badly with the supporters, but [the name change] is a pretty sound idea." Simon Chadwick, professor of Sport Business Strategy and Marketing at the Coventry University Business School, opined that the objective of opening up lucrative new markets for shirt sales, merchandise and broadcast deals shows commercial vision and could bring benefits, but "this needs to be backed up by a proper marketing strategy and investment." He said, "it's no use thinking changing the name or the colour of the shirt will pay instant dividends." David Stern, commissioner of the National Basketball Association in the United States, warned: "I would say a wise owner [of a sports club] would view his ownership as something of a public trust, in addition to the profit motive, and you really do want to allow the fans a little bit more input than I think is being allowed, with respect to Hull."

On 17 March 2014, the FA membership committee advised that the name change application be rejected at the FA Council meeting on 9 April. In response, the club published a statement saying the FA was "prejudiced" and criticised the committee's consultation with the City Till We Die opposition group. The following week, the club opened a ballot of season ticket holders over the name change. Opponents of the name change criticised as "loaded" the questions, which asked respondents to choose between "Yes to Hull Tigers with the Allam family continuing to lead the club", "No to Hull Tigers" and "I am not too concerned and will continue to support the club either way", on the grounds that voters were not given the option to reject the name while keeping the Allam family as owners. Of 15,033 season ticket holders, 5,874 voted in all, with 2,565 voting in favour of the change and 2,517 against, while 792 chose the "not too concerned" option.

On 9 April 2014, the FA Council announced its decision, carried by a 63.5% vote of its members, to reject the club's application for a name change. The club responded by stating it will appeal the decision. However, since there is no appeal process with the FA and its Council, the decision is final. On 11 September 2014, Allam confirmed an appeal has been submitted to the Court of Arbitration for Sport. He also held a news conference confirming the club had been put up for sale due to the English FA's decision on 9 April 2014.

In October 2014, interviewed by the BBC, Allam confirmed that he would "not invest a penny more in the club" unless he is allowed to change the club's name to Hull Tigers. In the same interview, Allam said, "I have never been a football fan. I am still not a football fan. I am a community fan."

2015: Re-application 
In March 2015, an independent panel appointed by the Court of Arbitration for Sport ruled that the decision of the Football Association Council to block the name change "cannot stand" on account of the process having been "flawed."

In July 2015, the Football Supporters Federation confirmed that a 70/30 decision was made in favour of Hull City A.F.C. not changing their name after an FA vote.

Grounds 

Between 1904 and 1905, Hull City played their home games at the Boulevard. This ground was used by Hull on a contract which allowed them to use it when not used for Rugby League, at a cost of £100 per annum. Hull built their own ground, Anlaby Road, which was opened in 1906. With the threat of the rerouting of the railway line through the Anlaby Road ground, the club was convinced it needed to secure its future by owning its own ground. They negotiated the deal for land between Boothferry Road and North Road in 1929, which was financed by a £3,000 loan from the FA. Due to the club's financial difficulties, no work took place for three years, and development then stopped until 1939. In that year a proposal to build a new multi-purpose sports stadium on the site temporarily halted the club's plans to relocate, but when this plan failed the club resolved to continue with the stalled development of the site, in anticipation of moving to the new stadium in 1940. The outbreak of war, however, meant that the redevelopment again came to a halt, as the site was taken over by the Home Guard.

During the Second World War, Anlaby Road was damaged by enemy bombing, the repair cost of which was in the region of £1,000. The Cricket Club served notice to quit at the same time, and so in 1943 the tenancy was officially ended. Hull were forced to return to the Boulevard Ground from 1944 until 1945 because of the poor condition of the planned stadium at Boothferry Road. The new stadium was finally opened under the revised name of Boothferry Park on 31 August 1946.

Hull City, along with one of the city's rugby league sides, Hull F.C., moved into the newly built KC Stadium in 2002. The KC Stadium was named "Best Ground" at the 2006 Football League Awards.

Rivalries 

According to a 2003 poll, Hull City fans consider their main rival to be Yorkshire neighbours Leeds United.

The club also has a traditional rivalry with Sheffield United. In 1984, Sheffield United won promotion at Hull City's expense with the teams level on points and goal difference and separated only by goals scored, with 33 of United's goals scored by former Hull City striker Keith Edwards. City's final game of the season against Burnley had been rescheduled due to bad weather and took place after their promotion rivals had finished their campaign; Hull went into the game knowing that a three-goal victory would mean promotion, but in front of a crowd which included a number of United fans could manage only a 2–0 win, ensuring that United went up instead.

Distant rivals include teams from across the Humber Estuary in Lincolnshire, Scunthorpe United and Grimsby Town. With Scunthorpe's promotion from League One, the 2007–08 Championship season saw the return of a "Humber Derby". Additionally, Lincoln City and non-league York City are said to consider Hull amongst their rivals.

The club's main hooligan firm appears to be the Hull City Psychos, dating back to the 1960s.

Finances 
In the club's annual report for the 12-month period up to 31 July 2009, auditors Deloitte stated that £4.4 million had gone out of the club and stadium company to owner Russell Bartlett's holding companies in loans, while at least £2.9 million of it was used in the take-over itself of the club. A further £560,000 was paid, according to the audit, by the stadium company to Bartlett's holding companies in "management fees," while at least £1 million was owed to him personally as a "salary". After the warning from	Deloitte, Bartlett gave the club a £4 million loan, "which	brought	the money he had taken out and put in since taking over to about even."

The corporate entity that owns the football club, "The Hull City Association Football Club (Tigers) Ltd," is currently owned by Allamhouse Limited, a privateF, limited-liability company with a share capital of £10 million, registered in Jersey. The beneficial owners of Allamhouse Limited, established in 2009, are the Allam family.

On an "Opacity Score" of 100, where zero indicates complete openness and 100 complete secrecy, the company which owns the club has been rated by Christian Aid at 87.

Hull City's corporate accounts, show a £25.6 million loss, on revenues of £11 million, after player and management costs of "just under £23 million." The club has "future tax losses" available of more than £45 million. Another Assam Allam company, Allam Marine, also wholly owned by Allamhouse Limited, revealed in its 2012 accounts that "utilisation of tax losses from group companies" reduced its tax liability by £3.8 million over 2011 and 2012.

As reported, HM Revenue and Customs are in the process of an inquiry at Hull City AFC, as part of the British tax authorities' targeting of football clubs over "tax-free payments to players under image rights' deals and the provision of benefits in kind. For Hull City AFC, the provision for benefits in kind was reported at £682,000 as of July 2011, growing to £810,000 by July 2012.

Records and statistics 

Andy Davidson holds the record for Hull City league appearances, having played 579 matches. Garreth Roberts comes second, having played 487 matches. Chris Chilton is the club's top goalscorer with 222 goals in all competitions; Chilton also holds the club record for goals scored in the League (193), FA Cup (16) and League Cup (10).

The club's widest victory margin in the league was their 11–1 win against Carlisle United in the Third Division North on 14 January 1939. Their biggest win in the top flight was achieved on 28 December 2013, with a 6–0 victory over Fulham.

Their heaviest defeat in the league was 8–0 against Wolverhampton Wanderers in 1911, a record which was equalled against Wigan Athletic on 14 July 2020 in the EFL Championship. Their heaviest top flight defeat was a 7–1 defeat to Tottenham Hotspur on 21 May 2017.

Hull City's record home attendance is 55,019, for a match against Manchester United on 26 February 1949 at Boothferry Park, with their highest attendance at their current stadium, the KC Stadium, 25,030 set on 9 May 2010 against Liverpool for the last match of the season.

The highest transfer fee received for a Hull City player is up to £22 million from West Ham for Jarrod Bowen. The highest transfer fee paid for a player is £13 million for Ryan Mason from Tottenham Hotspur.

European record 

Notes
 3Q: Third qualifying round
 PO: Play-off round

Players

Current squad

Out on loan

Reserves and Juniors 

Hull City Reserves play in the Reserve League East Division. The team plays home fixtures at the Church Road Ground, home of North Ferriby United. Hull City Juniors play in the Football League Youth Alliance, playing their home fixtures at Winterton Rangers' home stadium.

Hull City Women 

Hull City Women play in the Northern Combination Women's Football League. In the 2006–07 season, the team finished seventh in the table with 33 points.

Player of the Year

Club management

Coaching positions

|}

Managerial history

Only professional, competitive matches are counted.

* Caretaker manager
† Temporary Football Management Consultant

Honours and achievements 
EFL Championship (tier 2)
 2nd place promotion: 2012–13
 Play-off winners: 2007–08, 2015–16
Football League Third Division / Third Division North / League One (tier 3)
 Champions: 1932–33, 1948–49, 1965–66, 2020–21
 2nd place promotion: 1958–59, 2004–05
 3rd place promotion: 1984–85
Football League Fourth Division / League Two (tier 4)
 2nd place promotion: 1982–83, 2003–04
FA Cup
Runners-up: 2014
Football League Trophy
 Runners-up: 1984
Watney Cup
 Runners-up: 1973

References

External links 

Hull City A.F.C. official website

 
1904 establishments in England
Association football clubs established in 1904
Football clubs in the East Riding of Yorkshire
Sport in Kingston upon Hull
Football clubs in England
English Football League clubs
Premier League clubs